Philip George William Bond (1 November 1934 – 17 January 2017) was a British actor best known for playing Albert Frazer in 24 episodes of the 1970s BBC nautical drama The Onedin Line.

Life and career
Bond was born at 189 Uxbridge Street in Burton-on-Trent, Staffordshire, to Welsh parents Matthew William Bond (1899–1951) and Blodwen (née John; 1900–1981); he had an older brother, Ifor John Bond (1929–1992), and a twin sister, Shirley. Bond's first acting experience was at Burton Boys' Grammar School, where he was a pupil, and in addition attended classes at the School of Speech and Drama in Burton. In 1952 he joined the Central School of Speech and Drama (then based in rooms in the Royal Albert Hall), where contemporaries included Delena Kidd, Heather Sears and Ian Hendry. In 1957, he played Sir John Marraby in the musical Zuleika, based on the novel Zuleika Dobson by Max Beerbohm.

His first television role was in the series ITV Television Playhouse (1958–61). He later appeared in, among others, The Saint (1963), Doctor Who (in the serial "The Daleks"; 1964), The Hound of the Baskervilles (1968), The Avengers (1969), Z-Cars (1969–75), Only Fools and Horses (1985), Casualty (2007), and Midsomer Murders (2007).

Bond's film roles include Count Five and Die (1957), Orders to Kill (1958), Foxhole in Cairo (1960), I Want What I Want (1972), and Fever Pitch (1997). He was interviewed in the 2008 documentary The Cult of The Onedin Line.

He married the television producer Pat Sandys (1926–2000) in 1959. The marriage was later dissolved. With Sandys he is the father of actresses Abigail and Samantha Bond, and the film and TV journalist Matthew Bond. He lived in the village of Abergwynfi in his parents' native Wales.

He died at the age of 82 on 17 January 2017, while on holiday in Madeira.

Filmography

Film

Television

References

External links

Bond on The Avengers Forever website

1934 births
2017 deaths
Alumni of the Royal Central School of Speech and Drama
Alumni of the University of Oxford
English people of Welsh descent
British male film actors
British male television actors
People from Burton upon Trent
Actors from Staffordshire